Ogre Municipality is a municipality in Vidzeme, Latvia. The municipality was formed in 2002 by merging Ogre town and Ogresgals Parish. In 2009 it absorbed Krape Parish, Ķeipene Parish, Laubere Parish, Madliena Parish, Mazozoli Parish, Meņģele Parish, Suntaži Parish and Taurupe Parish, the administrative centre being Ogre. The population in 2021 was 57,617.

During the 2021 Latvian administrative reform, the previous municipality was merged with Ikšķile Municipality, Ķegums Municipality and Lielvārde Municipality. The new municipality now fully corresponds with the area of the former Ogre District.

Population

Twin towns – sister cities

Ogre is twinned with:

 Ånge, Sweden
 Bollnäs, Sweden
 Chernihiv, Ukraine
 Hengelo, Netherlands
 Jõhvi, Estonia
 Joué-lès-Tours, France
 Kelmė, Lithuania
 Kerava, Finland
 Maymana, Afghanistan
 Popasna, Ukraine
 Slonim, Belarus

Images

See also
 Administrative divisions of Latvia (2009)

References

 
Municipalities of Latvia